The Microtraining method is an approach aimed at supporting informal learning processes in organizations and companies. Learning in this sense means that an active process of knowledge creation is taking place within social interactions, but outside of formal learning environments or training facilities. This process can be facilitated by well-designed and structured systems and by supporting ways of communication and collaboration, like the Microtraining method does. A Microtraining arrangement comprises a time span of 15–20 minutes for each learning session, which can activate and maintain learning processes for a longer period if bundled into series. A Microtraining session can be held face-to-face, online or embedded in an e-learning scenario.

Applicability
The Microtraining method can be applied to learning situations within organizations and companies, especially when basic knowledge needs to be refreshed or improved and when information is needed for immediate use in daily practice. In comparison to formal learning, Microtraining is an approach aimed at structuring informal learning activities. While formal learning may be a successful approach for people with less knowledge and skills [Tynjälä, 2008], it can be counter-productive for more experienced employees [Jonassen et al., 1993] for whom informal blended learning approaches like Microtraining appear to be working very well [Jonassen/Mayes/McAleese, 1993; Jonassen, 1997].

Organizational requirements
With regard to organizational requirements, facilitating the new learning concept by management and accompanying the initial phase of implementing the Microtraining method are crucial for its success. Consequently, the Microtraining method is not meant to be an approach to designing learning materials alone, but involves analyzing learning processes in organizations and supporting change management of learning strategies as a whole. If, for example, employees have insufficient access to a computer or web services supporting online learning activities that are part of the Microtraining approach or if they are not allowed to spend working time learning, any effort to design the best material and collaborative surroundings will fail.

Didactical principles
The Microtraining method is based on several current learning theories and concepts, one of the most important of which is the theory of Social Constructivism, which sees learning as an active process, taking into account the learner's individual background [Vygotsky, 1978]. The second crucial idea comes from the concept of connectivism, which states that learning is not an internal, solitary process, but that new knowledge is acquired best while working and learning in a lively community [Siemens, 2005].

The method
Microtraining sessions are structured as follows:

1 Active start (3 minutes)
 Start with a mental activity e.g. thinking, reflecting, organizing and comparing
 Communicate the goal of the session

2 Exercise / Demonstration (6 minutes)
 Connect with different learning styles by using a combination of pictures, sounds and text.
 Stimulate the learning process by giving concrete examples

3 Feedback/ Discussion (4 minutes)
 Ensure effective, direct and positive feedback
 Stimulate both discussion and knowledge sharing between participants
 Check if all participants really understand the content by asking questions

4 Conclusion: What's next? How do we learn more? (2 minutes)
 What are the topics we will discuss during the next meeting(s)
 Discuss how to retain the knowledge
 Stimulate involvement and ensure participants leave with a clear goal

References
  Cross, J.: Informal Learning: Rediscovering the Natural Pathways that Inspire Innovation and Performance. Pfeiffer, San Francisco, 2007.
 De Vries, P., Lukosch, H., Pijper, G. (2009). Far away yet close: the Learning Strategy of a Transport Company. In: Conference Proceedings ICWL, International Conference on Web based Learning, Aachen.
 Jonassen, D., Mayes, T., & McAleese, R.: A manifesto for a constructivist approach to uses of technology in higher education. In T.M. Duffy, J. Lowyck, & D.H. Jonassen (Eds.), Designing environments for constructive learning. Springer-Verlag, Heidelberg, 1993, pp. 231–247.
 Jonassen, D. H.: Instructional Design Models for Well-Structured and Ill-Structured Problem-Solving Learning Outcomes. In: Educational Technology Research and Development 45 (1): 1997, pp. 65–94.
 Lukosch, H., De Vries, P. (2009): Mechanisms to support Informal Learning at the workplace. In: Conference Proceedings of ICELW 2009, International Conference on E-Learning in the Workplace, NY.
 Lukosch, H., Overschie, M.G.F., De Vries, P.  (2009): Microtraining as an effective way towards sustainability. In: Conference Proceedings of Edulearn09, Barcelona.
 Overschie, M.G.F. and A. van Wayenburg: Microteaching Manual: Effective transfer of knowledge for Sustainable Technological Innovation. TU Delft. On http://www.microteaching.org, August 2007.
 Siemens, G.: Connectivism: A Learning Theory for the Digital Age. In: International Journal of Instructional Technology and Distance Learning, Vol. 2, No. 1, 2005.
 Tynjälä, Päivi: Perspectives into learning at the workplace. Educational Research Review 3 (2008), pp. 130–154.
 Vygotsky, L.S. Mind and society: The development of higher mental processes. Harvard University Press, Cambridge, MA, 1978.

Applied learning